Sacred Heart Matriculation Higher Secondary School is located in Sholinganallur, Chennai, India. It is considered to be one of the best schools in Sholinganallur and surrounding localities.  Many of its students graduate with high marks and enter top universities like Anna University, Indian Institutes of Technology and Birla Institute of Technology and Science.

History
The school was instituted in 1988 by Dr. Rex Abraham together with his wife Janet Abraham, with the former serving as the Correspondent, and the latter serving as the Principal, from the day of its inception. Class were added year after year, and the school produced its first 10th standard graduates in the year 1993. Its first 12th grade batch graduated in 1995. The school currently has 2000+ students.

The School
Sacred Heart is recognized by the Government Of Tamil Nadu and offers classes from Kindergarten to Grade XII. The school claims to  follow a Comprehensive Evaluation Scheme (CCE) for grades I to IX. From grade VI onwards, the students and the teaching staff of the school are divided into divided into four "houses" as follows:

 Red
 Blue
 Green and 
 Yellow

Accordingly, each student is given a shirt of the colour of their respective house, and is made to wear it on Fridays. The school refers these, as "House Dresses".

The school claims that this will help in developing a competitive spirit among young minds. And as such, Annual Inter-house competitions take place, usually during the month of August.

Sports
The school offers free training for its students in Volley Ball, Throw Ball, and paid training in Cricket, all taking place after school hours. However, for those whose marks are very poor, special classes after school are conducted, and thus, will not be able to take part in the sports training.

The School's sports teams frequently participate in various tournaments, each year.

House matches are conducted yearly between July–August, which the school claims, increase the competitive spirit and team spirit among its pupils.

Leadership Training Programmes
The school has the following Leadership training programmes:
 Scouts And Guides
 Junior Red Cross (JRC)
 National Cadet Corps (NCC) (for boys only) and,
 Road Safety Patrol(For students), a sub unit of Chennai Traffic Police

High schools and secondary schools in Tamil Nadu